Bangalore Rural district, is one of the 31 districts in Karnataka, India. It was formed in 1986, when Bangalore District was divided into Bangalore Rural and Bangalore Urban. Presently in Bangalore Rural district, there are 1 division, 4 talukas, 20 hoblies, 294 villages, 3 towns, 2 tier-three cities, administered by 66 Village Panchayats (Grama Panchayitis), 3 Town Municipal Councils (Purasabes) and 2 City Municipal Councils (Nagarsabes).

Proximity to the city of Bangalore has its impact on the district, with a considerable daily commuting population. The rural people are mostly agriculturists, although with the advent of Special Economic Zones in the area, service and IT industries are booming. Devanahalli is set to be the site of a 95 billion Devanahalli Business Park, near the Kempegowda International Airport.

District profile

According to the 2011 census, the total population of the district was, 990,923 of which 21.65% were urban with a population density of 309 persons per km2. Bangalore Rural district has 22.5% of its population belonging to the Scheduled Caste and Scheduled Tribe. Hinduism is the major religion of this district. The Bengaluru Rural district is essentially an agriculture district but it has sufficient scope for industrialisation, dairy development and sericulture.

It is the second least populous district in Karnataka (out of 30), after Kodagu.
The district is endowed with agricultural and horticultural crops such as ragi, rice, groundnut, sugarcane, castor, grapes, mulberry, etc. There are adequate infrastructural facilities such as transport and communications, banking, credit, and marketing. Though the region is not rich in mineral resources, its non-metallic mineral resources are utilised for bricks, tiles, and stoneware manufacture. For many years, weaving has also been a major occupation for a large section of the population. The soil and such climatic conditions are congenial for the cultivation of mulberry, rearing of silkworms, and production of silk, besides other agro-based industries. There are a number of wineries and quantity of production of wine has been increasing. There is a proposal by the Government of Karnataka to rename Bengaluru Rural district to Kempe Gowda. In September 2007, the taluks of Kanakapura, Ramanagara, Magadi and Channapatna were merged to form the Ramanagara district.

Demographics

According to the 2011 census Bengaluru Rural district has a population of 990,923. This gives it a ranking of 449th in India (out of a total of 640). Its population growth rate over the decade 2001-2011 was 16.02%. Bengaluru Rural has a sex ratio of  945 females for every 1000 males, and a literacy rate of 78.29%. Scheduled Castes and Scheduled Tribes make up 21.57% and 5.34% of the population respectively.

At the time of the 2011 census, 65.67% of the population spoke Kannada, 23.84% Telugu, 7.22% Urdu and 1.29% Tamil as their first language.

See also
One School at a Time

References

External links

 Official website

 
Districts of Karnataka
1986 establishments in Karnataka